Nicholas Edmund Anthony Ashley-Cooper, 12th Earl of Shaftesbury, DL (born 3 June 1979), also known as Nick Ashley-Cooper or Nick Shaftesbury, is an English peer, landowner and philanthropist. He succeeded his brother as Earl of Shaftesbury in 2005.

He also holds the subsidiary titles Baron Ashley and Baron Cooper.

In 2019 he was appointed as a Deputy Lord Lieutenant of Dorset.

Early life

Nicholas Ashley-Cooper was born on 3 June 1979, in London, the younger son of Anthony Ashley-Cooper, 10th Earl of Shaftesbury (1938–2004), and his Swedish wife Christina Eva Montan (born c. 1940), the daughter of Nils Montan, a former Swedish Ambassador to Germany. His godfathers were Gerald Grosvenor, 6th Duke of Westminster, and Simon Elliot, later brother-in-law of Charles, Prince of Wales.

He had an elder brother, Anthony Nils Christian Ashley-Cooper (1977–2005), who in 2004 became 11th Earl of Shaftesbury, and also an elder half-brother and half-sister from Lady Shaftesbury's first marriage. 

His father, the 10th Earl, was murdered in November 2004 by the brother of his third wife, Jamila, and was succeeded by his elder son. Jamila is currently serving a twenty-year prison sentence as an accomplice to the murder. 

Six months later, on 15 May 2005, the 11th Earl died of a heart attack in Manhattan, New York, while visiting his younger brother, and Ashley-Cooper thus unexpectedly succeeded him in the earldom. The Daily Telegraph described the new Earl as "a tattooed young raver". He then relocated to his family home from New York City and assumed the responsibilities of the earldom.

Career
Before inheriting the family estates, Shaftesbury worked in television and music. He began as a strategic analyst with Discovery Networks Europe, a television network, then worked on Digital Strategy and Business Development for Terra Firma Capital Partners, after its acquisition of the music company EMI Group. He was then part of a team that raised over $5 million for Saatchi Online, an online forum and art gallery, and finally was the chief operating officer of GoMix, an interactive music software platform company.

Marriage and children
On 11 September 2010, in Dorset, Shaftesbury married Dinah Streifeneder (born 12 September 1980 in Munich), the daughter of Dr Fritz Streifeneder, a retired German orthopaedic surgeon, and Renata Leander-Streifeneder, an Argentinian physiotherapist. She spent her early life in Rome, Italy.

The Countess of Shaftesbury is a veterinary surgeon by profession and has taken the lead in the restoration of St Giles House.

The couple have three children. Their son, Anthony Francis Wolfgang Ashley-Cooper, Lord Ashley, born on 24 January 2011, is his father's heir apparent and the only person in the line of succession to the earldom. A daughter, Lady Viva Constance Lillemor Ashley-Cooper, was in 2012, and another daughter, Lady Zara Emily Tove Ashley-Cooper, in 2014.

Shaftesbury Estates 

Wimborne St Giles in East Dorset is the home base and centre of business of the Ashley-Coopers.

The village of Wimborne St Giles rests within the family estate itself. The Ashley family arrived in Dorset, originally from Wiltshire, where they owned the manor of Ashley, since the 11th century. The first ancestor to reside in Wimborne St Giles was Robert Ashley (born c. 1415), fifth great grandfather of Anthony Ashley Cooper, 1st Earl of Shaftesbury.

Built in 1651, the family seat of St Giles House has fallen into disrepair and has been unoccupied for about 60 years. In 2001, St Giles House was recorded on the Register of Buildings at Risk, as a Grade I listed building, indicating neglect and decay. Buildings recorded on the Grade I list include those of "exceptional interest, sometimes considered to be internationally important".

Discussions regarding future use of St Giles House and the estate have been resumed following inheritance by the 12th Earl of Shaftesbury. Work on the house began in 2011 and since then the restoration has won several national awards including the 2014 Georgian Group Awards for the Restoration of a Georgian Country House, the 2015 Royal Institute of Chartered Surveyors (RICS) Award for Building Conservation, the 2015 Historic Houses Association/Sotheby's Restoration Award, and the Historic England Angel Award, Best Rescue of a Historic Building or Site.

Mainsail Haul
During World War II, the house was requisitioned and used as a school for girls evacuated from London, called Miss Faunce's Parents' National Union School. At that time, the family took up residence at the dower house, known as Mainsail Haul.

Lough Neagh

The earl owns the bed and soil of Lough Neagh in Northern Ireland, the largest lake in the United Kingdom. The lough supplies 40 per cent of the region's drinking water and is also used as a sewage outfall (in a system only permissible through British Crown immunity). Discussions over the future management of the Lough have been ongoing with the Northern Ireland Assembly.

Philanthropy
Shaftesbury is an ambassador for the spinal cord injuries charity Wings For Life, which he began supporting following his own spinal injury. Shaftesbury has competed in several marathons and ultra-marathons to benefit charitable organisations.

Honours and appointments
Shaftesbury was commissioned a Deputy Lieutenant of Dorset in 2019.

References

External links 
 https://shaftesburyestates.com/
 Interview following the Atacama Desert Race

1979 births
Living people
English people of Swedish descent
English people of French descent
People educated at Eton College
Alumni of the University of Manchester
Alumni of London Business School
12
Nicholas
British male long-distance runners
Deputy Lieutenants of Dorset
English DJs
21st-century British farmers
Younger sons of earls